QEH may be an abbreviation for:

Queen Elizabeth Hall, a music venue in London, England
Queen Elizabeth's Hospital, a school in Bristol, England
Queen Elizabeth Hospital, Adelaide
Queen Elizabeth Hospital, Hong Kong
Queen Elizabeth House, an educational institution in Oxford, England

See also 
Qeh, a village in Iran
Queen Elizabeth School (disambiguation)
Queen Elizabeth Hospital (disambiguation)